Gordie Johnson (born 22 May 1964) is a Canadian musician, best known as the front man for the blues/reggae rock band Big Sugar, Austin-based blues/gospel band Sit Down Servant, and southern rock band Grady.

Johnson is a Grammy nominated producer, mixer and session musician. He has produced, or mixed, albums and tracks for artists such as Gov't Mule, Warren Haynes, The Glorious Sons, Taj Mahal, Bushwick Bill, Toots Hibbert, Sarah Slean, The Trews, Joel Plaskett Emergency, The Respectables, Tim Chaisson, Len, Reel Big Fish, Chris Duarte, Caroline Neron, Meredith Shaw, as well as playing and/or recording with Chris Robinson, Rich Robinson, Colin James, Default, Honky, Len, Molly Johnson, Jonny Lang and Double Trouble, Ashley MacIsaac, the Bourbon Tabernacle Choir, and Big Rude Jake.

Biography
Johnson was born in Winnipeg, Manitoba, of Ukrainian descent, and grew up in Windsor, Ontario, starting his professional music career while still in high school as he frequently crossed the river to play in Detroit, Michigan. He played all genres of music in both Detroit and Windsor. Johnson's family moved to Medicine Hat, Alberta as he was about to go into his last year of high school. He completed school and then immediately returned to Ontario to become a full-time musician. He is a vocalist and guitarist for the reggae rock band Big Sugar, the latin jazz band Sit Down Servant in which he plays a triple-neck steel guitar along with Moog bass pedals, and the cowboy metal band Grady. Alex Johnson, his wife, is also his long-time manager and performs and cowrites in Big Sugar.

Johnson is a bandleader, solo artist and also plays in other bands. In 1999, Johnson performed solo as part of The White Ribbon Concert at the Phoenix Concert Theatre in Toronto. He has toured as a bass player with Rich Robinson and Wide Mouth Mason and currently plays bass and tres guitar with Rey Arteaga's Latin music group based in Austin, Texas when not on tour with Big Sugar.

In 2020, with the world going into lockdown, the record release show and tour for Big Sugar's new album Eternity Now was cancelled and Gordie Johnson performed the release show "live" online that saw him playing and singing live, accompanied by the recorded bedtracks. During the pandemic, the Johnsons added a full video studio to their music studio allowing Gordie to hone his video production skills along with his record producing, while Alex became his assistant studio engineer for online projects. Over the next two years, Johnson would go on to perform a record release show for the Deluxe Anniversary Hemi-Vision 25th Anniversary album, this time re-recording all parts himself and again performing guitar and vocals live along with friends Warren Haynes, Chris Robinson, Rich Robinson, Colin James, Jason McCoy and a rousing edition of "If I Had My Way" closing out the show that saw hundreds of fans videos edited into the performance. It was such a feat that the record release show had to be delayed a day as Johnson put it all together in his studio.

Critical acclaim accompanied the release of a one season "GJ in the SoundShack" series on YouTube that saw Gordie Johnson in a weekly episode talking (and occasionally performing) about a myriad of topics from songwriting to recording to a detailed look at equipment he uses.  

As the world opened up again, "One Man Big Sugar Show- The Acoustical Sounds of Gordie Johnson" started touring and brought his massive, well known and highly influential songbook to life with an acoustic performance drenched in blues and folk music that inspired Johnson's Big Sugar catalogue. It consists of tales of triumph and disaster, spoken by Johnson.

In 2022, Big Sugar returned to the stage with a new show and lineup. After the tragic death of Garry Lowe, Gordie Johnson spent the previous four years reimagining Big Sugar and is proud to announce new bassist, Ben Lowe, the 22 year old son of Garry. "Our music has always been about roots and culture and this is a perfect piece of that evolution. You can hear Big Sugar in Ben's DNA." A renewed Big Sugar also includes former tour mates drummer Joe Magistro (Black Crowes, B52s) and Scandinavian indie rock phenom keyboardist Kat Ottosen.

Awards and recognition

Johnson has earned numerous gold and platinum records with his band Big Sugar and as producer or musician with such acts as The Trews and Default.

Johnsons' Big Sugar has multiple Juno Award nominations including 1995 Breakthrough Artist, 1997 Rock Album of the Year and 1998 Group of the Year.

In 1995, Big Sugar won the European Edison Award one of the oldest music awards in the world.

In 2000, Johnson was named to the 'Toronto Star Best Dressed' list, a culmination of his decades-long Hugo Boss endorsement.

SOCAN #1 Song Awards as songwriter for Big Sugar "The Scene" in 1998 and The Trews "Not Ready To Go" in 2002.

In 2003, Gibson guitar released a special edition limited run "Gordie Johnson signature series SGJ" guitar that incorporated fashion house Hugo Boss with a HUGO neckstrap and hardshell case (as the longtime clothing endorser of Gordie Johnson and Big Sugar). Hard Rock Café Hotel & Casino created a Gordie Johnson display in the Vancouver, Canada location for its opening in 2013 that featured the "SGJ".

In 2005, Johnson and his Grady bandmates won Best New Band at the Austin Music Awards.

In 2007, COCA (Canadian Organization of Campus Activities) inducted Johnsons' Big Sugar into the Hall of Fame.

In 2010, Gordie Johnson was inducted into the Canada South Blues Society Hall of Fame.

In 2011, Gordie Johnson was nominated for a Grammy for his producer role on the Warren Haynes album "Man in Motion". This followed the Grammy-nominated Taj Mahal album that he co-produced/engineered in 2008.

WCMA nominations for Producer of the Year 2012, Engineer of the Year 2013.

In 2015 Johnson and his Big Sugar bandmates were awarded a Road Gold Award.

Discography

Big Sugar
 1991 – Big Sugar
 1993 – Five Hundred Pounds
 1995 – Dear M.F. (EP)
 1995 – Ride Like Hell (EP)
 1996 – Hemi-Vision
 1998 – Heated
 1999 – Chauffe à bloc (EP)
 2000 – Extra Long Life (as Alkaline)
 2001 – Brothers and Sisters, Are You Ready?
 2001 – Brothers and Sisters, Êtes Vous Ready?
 2003 – Hit & Run
 2011 – Revolution Per Minute
 2012 – Eliminate Ya! DVD live CD
 2014 – Yardstyle
 2015 – Calling All The Youth
 2020 –  Eternity Now

Sit Down Servant
 2012 – I Was Just Trying To Help
 2014 – Sit Down Servant

Grady
 2006 – Y.U. So Shady?
 2007 – A Cup of Cold Poison
 2009 – Good As Dead

Wide Mouth Mason
2011 - No Bad Days

See also

Music of Canada
Canadian rock
List of Canadian musicians

References

External links 
 Official Grady Johnson Web Site

1964 births
Living people
Musicians from Winnipeg
20th-century Canadian male singers
Canadian rock singers
Canadian rock guitarists
Canadian male guitarists
Canadian record producers
Canadian people of Ukrainian descent
Musicians from Alberta
People from Medicine Hat
Musicians from Austin, Texas
21st-century Canadian male singers
20th-century Canadian guitarists
21st-century Canadian guitarists